The Fred Page Cup is a championship ice hockey trophy, won by a tournament conducted by the Canadian Junior Hockey League.  The award is given to the winner of a round-robin and playoff between the Bogart Cup champions of the Central Canada Hockey League, the Kent Cup champions of the Maritime Junior Hockey League, La Coupe NAPA Champions of the Quebec Junior Hockey League, and a pre-determined host team.  The winner of the Fred Page Cup moves on to the Centennial Cup, the national Junior A championship.  The trophy was donated by the then-called Quebec Provincial Junior Hockey League in 1994–95.

History
The first Fred Page Cup was awarded in 1995.  The trophy was donated by the Quebec Provincial Junior A Hockey League to create an Eastern Canadian Championship in honour of past Canadian Amateur Hockey Association President Fred Page.  The 1995 Championship marked the first time teams outside of the maritime provinces were allowed to compete for the Eastern Canadian Championship for a berth to the National Championship.  Now allowed are the maritime champions, the Quebec champions, and the Ottawa District champions of the Central Canada Hockey League.  Prior to 1995, the Callaghan Cup was the championship trophy of Eastern Canada to be played for by a representative of the maritime provinces.  Early championships were dominated by the Island Junior Hockey League.  In the early 1990s, the top teams of the IJHL jumped to the Maritime Junior A Hockey League.

The Ottawa Jr. Senators were awarded the 2003 Fred Page Cup in the fall of 2001, but over the summer of 2002, the tournament was awarded the Cornwall Colts instead. This was mostly due to the size of the Jr. Senators arena and the conflict with other groups, therefore the event couldn't be attainable. The Nepean Raiders surprisingly never bid for the tournament, despite reaching the league finals eight times between 2003 and 2013. The event could not be supported with a low fan-base and reaching an agreement with the city. The 2006 Fred Page Cup was then awarded to Pembroke, Ontario and the Pembroke Lumber Kings.

To date, the Central Canada Hockey League has won the Fred Page Cup seven times, winning the Royal Bank Cup finals once, (Pembroke Lumber Kings) since its inception in 1996. The Quebec Junior Hockey League has won the Fred Page Cup only three times, and no team from Quebec have qualified for the Royal Bank Cup finals. The Maritime Junior A Hockey League is the only league to win the Fred Page Cup and have teams win the Royal Bank Cup, as the Summerside Capitals won in 1997 and the Halifax Oland Exports won in 2002.

The 2010 Fred Page Cup was awarded to the Brockville Braves, who also hosted the tournament in 1997. Brockville won the 2010 Fred Page Cup by defeating the Pembroke Lumber Kings 5–1. The Braves are the second host team since the 1998–99 Charlottetown Abbies, who defeated the CCHL's Hawkesbury Hawks 2–0 at the Charlottetown Civic Centre. The Pembroke Lumber Kings are the only team to compete in six consecutive Fred Page Cup tournaments from 2006 to 2011, winning the tournament twice in 2007 and 2011, and losing the finals in 2006 and 2008.

In 2009, the traditional circulation was broken, when Dieppe, New Brunswick, and the Dieppe Commandos were awarded the tournament instead of a team from the Central Canada Hockey League. Maritime Hockey League champions Summerside Western Capitals elected to play their Fred Page Cup games in Summerside, Prince Edward Island, but this idea was quickly nixed because of a disagreement from the Quebec Junior Hockey League champion Sherbrooke Cougars.

The Kanata Stallions were chosen to host the 2012 Fred Page Cup, despite the team's poor performances since re-branding from the Kanata Valley Lasers in 2002. The Stallions managed to qualify for the semi-finals and avoided elimination with an over-time win over their crosstown rivals Nepean Raiders. The Kanata Stallions finished in third place in the tournament.

The Carleton Place Canadians became the first team to win back-to-back Fred Page Cup championships during the tournament's inception in 1996. They continued their streak with three straight wins from 2014 to 2016.

The 2018 tournament was awarded to Ottawa, which made it the second time the tournament was played in the Ottawa area. Pembroke placed a bid, but was passed over in favor of Ottawa. Smiths Falls placed a bid, but withdrew.

Champions

Notes

References

External links
Fred Page Cup Website
CCHL Website
LHJAAAQ Website
MHL Website
CJHL Website

 
Canadian Junior Hockey League trophies and awards